Nguyễn Bảo Quân (Viet : Nguyễn Bảo Quân) born on 19 August 1983, is a former Thể Công F.C  football player and now is the head coach of the Vietnam national futsal team and Thái Sơn Nam club.

He played for Vietnam at 2016 FIFA Futsal World Cup.

As an occupation, he has been managing the Thái Sơn Nam and Vietnam national futsal team.

References

1983 births
Living people
Futsal coaches
Vietnamese men's futsal players
Sportspeople from Hanoi